Princess Talita Natasha von Fürstenberg (born May 7, 1999), known professionally as Talita von Furstenberg, is an American socialite, fashion designer and model. She is the granddaughter of fashion designers Diane von Fürstenberg and Prince Egon von Fürstenberg and by birth a member of the House of Fürstenberg, an ancient Swabian noble family. In 2019, she launched her fashion line, TVF for DVF, in partnership with her grandmother's fashion house.

Personal life
Princess Talita Natasha von Fürstenberg was born on May 7, 1999, to socialites Princess Alexandra and Prince Alexander of Fürstenberg. On her father's side, she is a member of the German Princely Family of Fürstenberg and heiress of the Italian Agnelli family (her great-great grandparents were Edoardo Agnelli and Virginia Bourbon del Monte). Her paternal grandparents are fashion designers Diane von Fürstenberg and Prince Egon von Fürstenberg. Her maternal grandfather is billionaire businessman Robert Warren Miller. She has a younger brother, Prince Tassilo Egon Maximilian von Fürstenberg, and two younger half brothers, Prince Leon (b. 2012) and Prince Vito zu Fürstenberg (b. 2020). She is the niece of Pia Getty, Marie-Chantal, Crown Princess of Greece, Princess of Denmark, and Princess Tatiana von Fürstenberg. She is a second cousin once-removed of Coco Brandolini d'Adda and Bianca Brandolini d’Adda. Her parents divorced in 2002. Her mother later married Dax Miller and her father married Ali Kay.

She graduated in 2017 from the Brentwood School in Los Angeles, where she was a member of the fencing team.  After graduating from high school, she attended Georgetown University with her cousin, Prince Constantine Alexios of Greece and Denmark, studying international relations. She later transferred to New York University, where she studies fashion business and marketing.

Career 
Von Fürstenberg has interned for Teen Vogue, as well as having been active in her grandmother's fashion house, DvF. In 2015 she was featured on the cover of the October issue and had her own spread for Tatler Magazine. She has also been featured in Teen Vogue. In 2016, von Fürstenberg worked as an intern for Hillary Clinton's presidential campaign.

In April 2016, von Fürstenberg was featured in Vanity Fair alongside two of her first cousins, Isabel Getty and Princess Maria-Olympia of Greece and Denmark.

In 2017, she walked the runway for Dolce & Gabbana during Milan Fashion Week. In 2018, she was named the new muse for DvF.

On April 24, 2019, von Fürstenberg launched her own line for DVF called TVF. The collection consists of 23 items and is targeted toward young people.

References

External links 
 

Living people
1999 births
Agnelli family
Talita
Miller family
American fashion designers
American people of Belgian-Jewish descent
American people of Greek-Jewish descent
American people of Moldovan-Jewish descent
Place of birth missing (living people)
American female models
American socialites
Female models from New York (state)
Fashion influencers
German princesses
Georgetown University people
Hispanic and Latino American female models
Jewish female models
American women fashion designers
Brentwood School (Los Angeles) alumni